The University Selection Test ( or PSU) was a standardized test used for college admissions in Chile. Since 2003 it has replaced the Prueba de Aptitud Académica (PAA) which had been in use since 1966. 

The PSU consists of four sections: Spanish, mathematics, history and science. The PSU is given once a year between November and December. It is required to take the math and Spanish portions of the test plus an elective one. The maximum score possible is 850 points, and the minimum is 150 points.
It is necessary to take the test to apply to a university ascribed to the Rector's Council, usually referred to as Traditional Universities. The only requirement to take this test is to have completed high school.

References
From aptitude to achievement: How's that going? for Symposium: University admission testing in Chile: Current controversies and future directions, (.pptx), 2018 International Test Commission Conference, Montréal
PSU : El Desafío del Cambio, (.pptx), Centro de Investigación Avanzada en Educación, Universidad de Chile, Santiago, diciembre 2016

Education in Chile
Standardized tests